Colour Haze is a stoner/psychedelic rock group from Munich, Germany, consisting of singer and guitarist Stefan Koglek, drummer Manfred Merwald, bassist Mario Oberpucher and keyboardist Jan Faszbender.

Formed in the mid-nineties, Colour Haze is one of the oldest German stoner outfits, and have since then become one of the flagships of the German stoner rock scene. Tours of the band have included headline spots at smaller national and international rock festivals, such as the U.S. festival Emissions from the Monolith in 2006 alongside Orange Goblin, Boris, and General Tso. Local media coverage have included a broadcast of a concert on national television, when Colour Haze appeared at Rockpalast in 2007.

Emerging from a sound heavily influenced by Kyuss on their first records, they moved away from a heavy to a more melodic sound, e.g. on their album All (2008), as remarked by Denmark's LowCut webzine.

Members

Current Line Up 
 Stefan Koglek - guitar, vocals
 Mario Oberpucher - bass guitar (2020–present)
 Manfred Merwald - drums (1998–present)
 Jan Faszbender - keyboards (2018–present)

Former Members 
 Tim Höfer - Drums (1994–1997)
 Christian Wiesner - bass guitar (1994–1998)
 Felix Neuenhoff - vocals (1997–1999)
 Philipp Rasthofer - bass guitar (1998–2020)

Discography

Studio albums 
 Chopping Machine CD (1995 David Records)
 Seven CD (1998 "Selfburn" Records)
 Periscope CD (1999 Toaster Records)
 CO2 LP/CD (2000 Homegrown Records/MonsterZeroRecords)
 Ewige Blumenkraft LP/CD (2001 MonsterZeroRecords)
 Los Sounds de Krauts LP/CD (2003 Nasoni Records/Elektrohasch Records)
 Colour Haze LP/CD (2004 Elektrohasch Records)
 Tempel LP/CD (2006 Elektrohasch Records)
 All LP/CD (2008 Elektrohasch Records)
 She Said LP/CD (2012 Elektrohasch Records)
 To The Highest Gods We Know LP/CD (2014 Elektrohasch Records)
 In Her Garden LP/CD (2017 Elektrohasch Records)
 We Are LP/CD (2019 Elektrohasch Records)
 Sacred LP/CD (2022 Elektrohasch Records)

Live albums
 Burg Herzberg Festival 18. Juli 2008 DCD (2009 Herzbergverlag)
 Live Vol.1 - Europa Tournee 2015 2CD/3LP ltd (2016 Elektrohasch Records)
 Live Vol.2 - Live At Duna Jam 2007 2CD/2LP (2019 Elektrohasch Records)
 Live Vol.3 2020 LP (2022 Elektrohasch Records)

Reissue 
 Periscope LP/CD (2003 Elektrohasch Records)
 2004 Extended Play LP/CD (2022 Elektrohasch Records)

EPs 
 Colour Haze/Color Cacas Swamp Room Single Club Split 7 inch (2001 Swamp Room Records)
 Colour Haze/Gas Giant Split 7 inch (2004 Elektrohasch Records)
 Colour Haze/Hypnos 69 Split 10 inch (2004 Elektrohasch Records)

Video 
 Live At The Himmelreich 23.03.2002 VHS (2002 Self Released)

Compilation appearances 
 "Pulse" on A Tribute to Mr. Betonohr (2002)
 A cover of Cactus's "One Way...Or Another" on Sucking the 70's - Back in the Saddle Again (2006 Small Stone Records)
 The Psychedelic Avengers and the Curse of the Universe (Fünfundvierzig 2004, 148)

Notes

External links 

 
 Colour Haze - Live at Crossroads Festival (October 18, 2007) on Rockpalast

German rock music groups
German stoner rock musical groups
German psychedelic rock music groups
Musical groups established in 1994
1994 establishments in Germany